The Larson Ice Center is a two rink facility arena located in Brookings, South Dakota.  Built in 2002, it is home to the South Dakota State Jackrabbits club ice hockey teams and the Brookings Rangers. From 2012 to 2019, it was also home the Tier II junior Brookings Blizzard of the North American Hockey League.

The Larson Ice Center has a seating capacity of approximately 2,000 in the main (Red) rink and 600 in the second (Blue) rink. There are ten locker rooms, with showers and bathrooms. The facility is also fully outfitted with large heated viewing areas, upper and lower level lobbies and an upper level concession area as well.

References

External links
Larson Ice Center - City of Brookings
Larson Ice Center - Brookings Rangers
Larson Ice Center - StadiumJourney.com

Indoor arenas in South Dakota
Indoor ice hockey venues in the United States
Buildings and structures in Brookings, South Dakota
Sports venues in South Dakota
North American Hockey League
Tourist attractions in Brookings County, South Dakota
2002 establishments in South Dakota
Sports venues completed in 2002
College ice hockey venues in the United States